Sarah M. Assmann is an American biologist known for her research on plants and signal transduction. She is an elected fellow of the American Association for the Advancement of Science.

Education and career 
Assmann undergraduate degree is from Williams College (1980). She earned her Ph.D. from Stanford University in 1986. Following her Ph.D., she was a postdoc at the University of California, Riverside until she joined the faculty at Harvard University in 1987. In 1993 she moved to Pennsylvania State and was promoted to professor in 1997. In 2002, Assmann was named the Waller Professor of Biology at Pennsylvania State University. 

From 2009 until 2010, she served as president of the American Society of Plant Biologists. Starting in 2020, Assmann is the Editor-in-Chief of the journal The Plant Cell.

Selected publications

Awards 

 Fellow, American Association for the Advancement of Science (2009)

References

Year of birth missing (living people)
Living people
21st-century American biologists
21st-century American women scientists
Pennsylvania State University faculty
American women academics